Eddie Cook may refer to:

 Ed Cook (basketball), Edmund "Eddie" Cook, American basketball player and coach
 Eddie Cook (boxer) (born 1966), American boxer
 Eddie Cook, see Prisoner characters – miscellaneous
 Eddie Cook, character in Paris Blues, played by Sidney Poitier
 Mickey Rourke (born 1952), written several films under the name "Sir Eddie Cook"

See also
 Ed Cook (disambiguation)
 Edward Cook (disambiguation)